Sir John Michael "Bawra" Higgins GCMG (9 December 1862 – 6 October 1937) was an Australian metallurgist, businessman and political organiser.

Early life
Higgins was born at Eureka Reef, Castlemaine, Victoria, the son of Enedor Stephens Higgins and his wife Elizabeth Jane, née Stephens, both Cornish. Higgins was educated at Rae's School, Sandhurst (now Bendigo) and at Bendigo High School. Afterwards he studied metallurgy and chemistry at the Bendigo School of Mines. Higgins was indentured to a chemist in Bendigo named Garside and afterwards ran a chemicals business of his own, which he sold to become an analyst with a New South Wales mine. He later became metallurgical chemist to the Australian Smelting Company at Dry Creek, South Australia, and when these works closed down, practised as a consulting metallurgist. Higgins also acquired interests in the wool industry and had land in Queensland and New South Wales. This led to his making a study of wool and he became an expert in its technology.

Career

With the outbreak of World War I in 1914, Higgins placed his knowledge at the disposal of the Federal Government, and was appointed honorary metallurgical adviser. Higgins represented the Federal Government on the Zinc Producers' Association and on the Copper Producers' Association, and also founded the Australian Metal Exchange. After the Imperial government bought the Australian wool clip in 1916, Higgins became Chairman and Governing Director of the Central Wool Committee.  In 1918 he was Chairman of directors of the British Australian Wool Realization Association, afterwards known as BAWRA, and was most successful in the management of the sale of the wool carried over at the end of the war. Higgins would not accept any salary or fee for his work as adviser to the government, but had a large salary as chairman of BAWRA, half of which was distributed every year to charitable and educational institutions. He held this position until 1926, when the association went into liquidation and he became trustee for a further six years. Higgins died at Melbourne on 6 October 1937 and was buried in Box Hill Cemetery.

Legacy

Sir John Higgins was married on 14 November 1889 to Frances Anna Maegraith/Magraith (1852-1932), later Dame Frances, the youngest daughter of Captain Robert Lovell Magraith (Maegraith; and Anna Balfour, of North Adelaide. Sir John Higgins and Frances Anna Higgins had no children. They lived at "Holyrood", Riverdale Rd, East Camberwell and later "Pentor", Toorak, Melbourne. Higgins was created KCMG in 1918 and GCMG in 1934.

Sir John Higgins was a wealthy philanthropist and assisted the government and the pastoral community during and after World War I. He was kind and charitable, and made many bequests and gifts to various organisations. Sir John and Dame Frances Higgins on various occasions gave sums amounting to about £10,000 to the University of Melbourne, and further considerable sums under his will. Many hospitals and other charitable institutions would also benefit from their generosity. The University of Melbourne promotes agriculture and veterinary science through the J. M. Higgins Research Foundation and the annual J. M. Higgins exhibition; the Royal Melbourne Institute of Technology's chemistry laboratory is named after Sir John and Lady Higgins.

References
Helga M. Griffin, 'Higgins, Sir John Michael (1862 - 1937)', Australian Dictionary of Biography, Volume 9, MUP, 1983, pp 289–290. 

1862 births
1937 deaths
Australian metallurgists
Australian Knights Grand Cross of the Order of St Michael and St George
Australian people of Cornish descent
Burials at Box Hill Cemetery